The Nebraska Cornhuskers rifle team represents the University of Nebraska–Lincoln in the Patriot Rifle Conference. Rifle became an official sport at the university in 1998 and competed as an independent for six years before joining the Great America Rifle Conference (GARC) in 2004. NU left the GARC for the Patriot Rifle Conference in 2021. The team practices and hosts meets at the ten-point indoor firing range located in NU's Military and Naval Sciences Building (ROTC). The team has been coached by Mindy Miles since 2021.

Although rifle is classified as a coeducational sport by the NCAA, Nebraska fields an all-female team.

Coaches

Coaching history

Coaching staff

Awards

All-Americans
Nebraska has had twelve first-team and twenty-six second-team National Rifle Association All-American selections.

Individual NCAA Championships

Nicole Allaire – 2000 
Kristina Fehlings – 2006 
Rachel Martin – 2015

Season-by-season results

Notes

References